Halocidin is an antimicrobial peptide isolated from the Halocynthia aurantium species of tunicate. In mouse models, derivative peptides have shown efficacy in the treatment of fungicidal resistant Candida Albacans when used as a mouthwash additive.

References 

Antimicrobial peptides